"P.S. I Love You" is a song recorded by English rock band the Beatles in 1962. It was composed principally by Paul McCartney (credited to Lennon–McCartney), and produced by Ron Richards. The song was released in the UK on 5 October 1962 as the B-side of their debut single "Love Me Do" and is also included on their debut album Please Please Me (1963). It was later included on the American release Introducing... The Beatles (1964), its reissue The Early Beatles (1965), and the Beatles compilation album Love Songs (1977).

Recording
The version featured on the single and album was recorded in ten takes on 11 September 1962 at EMI's Abbey Road Studios, London. Producer George Martin had booked session drummer Andy White as a replacement for Pete Best, whom he considered not technically good enough for recording purposes; Martin had been unaware that the other Beatles had already replaced Pete Best with Ringo Starr, who attended the session and plays maracas on the song. White was a freelance show band and session drummer, and gave the recording a lightweight cha cha treatment.

Martin was not present at the session; in his absence, it was run by Ron Richards. Richards told the group that the song could not be the A-side of their single because of an earlier song with the same title: "I was originally a music publishing man, a plugger, so I knew someone had done a record with that title. I said to Paul, 'You can have it as B-side, but not an A-side.'"

With Starr playing drums, the Beatles recorded the song at the BBC on 25 October 1962, 27 November 1962 and 17 June 1963 for subsequent broadcast on the BBC radio programmes Here We Go, Talent Spot and Pop Go the Beatles, respectively. The 17 June 1963 recording was officially published on the On Air – Live at the BBC Volume 2 album (2013).

Composition
Written in spring 1962, while Paul McCartney was in Hamburg, this song is sometimes considered to be a dedication to his then-girlfriend Dot Rhone. However, McCartney denies this:

John Lennon commented:

Melodically typical of McCartney's later writing style, the song demonstrates two notable exceptions to the contemporaneous model: during the opening chorus the chord D♭7 is placed incongruously between G and D (on write), and during the song's title phrase a sudden shift to B♭ occurs underneath "P.S. I love you" which Ian MacDonald described as "a dark sidestep". Lennon contributes a single note harmony emphasising the beginning of each stanza. Lyrically constructed with their female audience in mind, the Beatles included it as part of their Cavern Club song set.

Re-release
On its 20th anniversary, Parlophone re-issued "P.S. I Love You" as a picture disc, and shortly afterwards as a 12-inch disc.

Personnel
Paul McCartney – Lead vocals, bass
John Lennon – acoustic rhythm guitar, backing vocals
George Harrison – acoustic guitar, backing vocals
Ringo Starr – maracas 
Andy White – drums

Engineered by Norman Smith
Personnel per Ian MacDonald except where noted

For the Beatles' BBC session recorded 17 June 1963 and released on the album On Air – Live at the BBC Volume 2 (2013), Starr plays drums.

Charts

Weekly charts

Year-end charts

Notes

References

External links

Songs about letters (message)
1962 singles
1964 singles
The Beatles songs
Parlophone singles
Song recordings produced by George Martin
Songs written by Lennon–McCartney
Tollie Records singles
Music published by MPL Music Publishing
1962 songs